Martyn Paul Woolford (born 13 October 1985) is an English former professional footballer who last played as a midfielder for Frickley Athletic. He has played in the Football League for Scunthorpe United, Bristol City, Millwall, Sheffield United, Fleetwood Town and Grimsby Town.

Woolford started his career in the Northern Counties East Football League Premier Division with Glasshoughton Welfare after progressing through their youth system. After three seasons at Glasshoughton, he moved to the Northern Premier League Premier Division with Frickley Athletic and scored 14 goals during the 2005–06 season. He joined York City in the Conference National in 2006 and spent two seasons with the club, being joint top scorer with 17 goals in the second season. He moved to League One team Scunthorpe United in 2008 and featured in the 2009 Football League Trophy Final before scoring the winning goal in the 2009 League One play-off final against Millwall.

After a season-and-a-half of playing Championship football with Scunthorpe, he signed for their divisional rivals Bristol City in 2013. Two years later he signed for another Championship club, Millwall, but was released after their relegation to League One in 2015. He joined League One club Sheffield United, where he played one season before joining their divisional rivals Fleetwood Town. He played for the England C team, who represent England at non-League level, in 2008, earning two caps. He made his debut against Grenada and earned his second and final cap against India.

Early life
Woolford was born in Castleford, West Yorkshire. He comes from a family of professional sportsmen; father Neil and grandfather Cyril were both rugby league players with Featherstone Rovers. He has cited his father's encouragement as the main influence in his football career. He grew up supporting Manchester United.

Club career

Early career
Woolford started his career with Northern Counties East Football League Premier Division team Glasshoughton Welfare in 2002 after progressing through their youth system. Following the end of the 2002–03 season, he was given the award for the club's Most Improved Player, and early into 2003–04, he established himself as an "emerging talent". He played one match for the youth team of Doncaster Rovers in April 2005, but was not taken on by the club, and was also rejected by Barnsley and Bradford City. After three seasons at Glasshoughton, he joined Northern Premier League Premier Division club Frickley Athletic in August 2005, having impressed during several pre-season matches. He was awarded an FA contract running to the end of 2005–06 in October, with the option of another year. He made 40 league appearances and scored 12 goals for Frickley in 2005–06, with 14 goals in all competitions, after which the club exercised their option to extend his contract for another season.

York City

He had a trial with Stockport County of League Two during their pre-season trip to Ibiza in August 2006, but was not offered a contract. He was being tracked by Hartlepool United and York City, and also attracted interest from Guiseley. He eventually signed for Conference National club York on 31 August for an undisclosed five-figure fee after having made four appearances and scored one goal for Frickley at that point in 2006–07. He made his debut a day later in a 0–0 draw with Stafford Rangers after coming on as a 57th minute substitute. During his first start for the team, he was substituted for goalkeeper Arran Reid in the 17th minute after Tom Evans was sent off. He scored his first goal for York in the team's 3–2 home loss to Morecambe on 12 September. A week later, he scored both York's goals in a 2–1 away victory over Woking. He featured in both legs of York's play-off semi-final defeat by Morecambe 2–1 on aggregate and finished 2006–07 with 45 appearances and eight goals, after which the club exercised their option to extend his contract for another season.

He signed a new contract with York in October 2007, which would expire in the summer of 2009. He played in a more central position behind the strikers in 2007–08. He scored two goals in two minutes against Altrincham on 19 January 2008, which earned York a 2–2 draw, during which he played as a striker. Manager Colin Walker confirmed that several enquiries had been made about signing Woolford during the January transfer window. Woolford was set a 20-goal target by Walker in April 2008, at which point he had scored 16 goals. He was watched by Crewe Alexandra's director of football Dario Gradi in April 2008, after which Walker insisted he was still a part of York's plans for the next season. He finished 2007–08 with 57 appearances and 17 goals. He rejected speculation linking him with a move away from York in June, saying he would only move to a club two divisions higher.

Scunthorpe United

Woolford rejected a new contract with York during the summer of 2008, with Cheltenham Town and another club believed to be interested in signing him. He eventually joined League One club Scunthorpe United for an undisclosed fee on a three-year contract on 8 August 2008, with the fee believed to be a six-figure fee with a sell-on clause. He made his Football League debut as an 87th-minute substitute in a 1–0 victory against Peterborough United on 23 August 2008. He scored four minutes into his first start for Scunthorpe against Brighton & Hove Albion on 6 September 2008, giving his team the lead, in a match which eventually finished 4–1. He came on as a 77th-minute substitute for Scunthorpe in the 2009 Football League Trophy Final on 5 April 2009, which was lost 3–2 to League Two team Luton Town after extra time. Scunthorpe made it to the play-offs and Woolford scored in the semi-final first leg against MK Dons, before scoring the winning goal for Scunthorpe in the 2009 League One play-off final against Millwall on 24 May 2009, with a goal in the 85th minute that gave the team a 3–2 victory, and also assisting the other two goals. This resulted in promotion to the Championship for Scunthorpe and he was named man of the match.

His first appearance of 2009–10 was in a 4–0 defeat at Cardiff City on 8 August 2009. He scored the winning goal for Scunthorpe against Derby County on 15 August 2009, which finished as a 3–2 victory. Woolford scored two goals against Newcastle United on 20 October 2009 to give Scunthorpe a 2–1 victory. He finished the season with 46 appearances and five goals.

Woolford started 2010–11 after playing in a 2–1 victory at Reading on 7 August 2010 and his first goal of the season was the winner in the 83rd minute of a 2–1 victory over League One team Oldham Athletic in the League Cup on 10 August.

Bristol City and Millwall
Woolford signed a three-and-a-half-year contract with fellow Championship club Bristol City after joining for an undisclosed fee on 31 January 2011. He made his debut in a 4–0 victory at Preston North End on 5 February 2011, in which he assisted a Brett Pitman goal.

Woolford signed a two-and-a-half-year contract with Championship club Millwall on 9 January 2013. He made his debut after starting in a 1–1 draw away to Bolton Wanderers on 12 January 2013. Woolford was released by Millwall on 7 May 2015 after their relegation to League One, having made 40 appearances and scored three goals in 2014–15.

Sheffield United, Fleetwood Town and Grimsby Town
Woolford signed a two-year contract with League One club Sheffield United on 14 July 2015, having previously played under manager Nigel Adkins at Scunthorpe. He was released by United on 19 August 2016, having fallen out of favour under manager Chris Wilder, and immediately joined League One club Fleetwood Town on a one-year contract. He was released at the end of 2016–17.

On 31 August 2017, Woolford signed a one-year contract with League Two club Grimsby Town on a free transfer. He made his debut two days later, starting in a 1–0 home win over Crewe Alexandra, in which he was substituted in the 69th minute. He was offered a new contract by Grimsby at the end of the 2017–18 season. He was released by Grimsby at the end of the 2018–19 season.

Later career
Woolford signed for Northern Premier League Premier Division club Hyde United on 15 August 2019. He signed for National League North club Boston United on 9 October. In July 2020 he signed for Gainsborough Trinity of the Northern Premier League.

Frickley Athletic
In June 2021, Woolford returned to Frickley Athletic ahead of the 2021/22 season. After eight appearances and no goals, Woolford retired from playing following an injury.

International career
Woolford was placed on standby for the England C team for their 2007–09 International Challenge Trophy match against Wales in February 2008. He was called into the squad in May for two matches in the Caribbean after an injury to Dean Moxey. His debut came in a 1–1 draw with Grenada on 31 May 2008 and was described as a "constant threat down the left", and earned his second cap as a 67th-minute substitute against Barbados on 2 June.

Style of play
Woolford plays as a left winger, where he has been described as being "fleetfooted". He is versatile and has also played as a wing-back, left midfielder and a striker and has also been used in a more "roaming, attacking role" to offer support to a lone striker.

Personal life
Woolford was studying for a degree in civil engineering at Leeds Metropolitan University while playing for Frickley and a degree in surveying in 2006. While at university, he worked on a building site. He achieved a Higher National Diploma in civil engineering and has said he is looking to complete this degree before the end of his football career.

Career statistics

Honours
Scunthorpe United
Football League One play-offs: 2009
Football League Trophy runner-up: 2008–09

References

External links

Profile at the Boston United F.C. website

1985 births
Living people
Sportspeople from Castleford
Footballers from West Yorkshire
English footballers
England semi-pro international footballers
Association football wingers
Glasshoughton Welfare A.F.C. players
Frickley Athletic F.C. players
York City F.C. players
Scunthorpe United F.C. players
Bristol City F.C. players
Millwall F.C. players
Sheffield United F.C. players
Fleetwood Town F.C. players
Grimsby Town F.C. players
Hyde United F.C. players
Boston United F.C. players
Gainsborough Trinity F.C. players
Northern Counties East Football League players
Northern Premier League players
National League (English football) players
English Football League players
Alumni of Leeds Beckett University